Eric Taino (born March 18, 1975 in Jersey City, New Jersey, United States) is a retired ATP Tour American tennis player, who later represented the Philippines in international competition.

Before turning pro, he was the #1 player and captain of the then #2 nationally ranked UCLA tennis team and achieved All-American honors. His teammates included fellow pros Justin Gimelstob and Kevin Kim.

As a junior player, he won the 1992 US Open – Boys' Doubles with Jimmy Jackson by defeating the Chileans future World no. 1 singles player Marcelo Ríos and  Gabriel Silberstein. He started a professional career in 1997 and achieved the highest ranking of World No. 122 as a singles player on the ATP Tour in November 2003. He was also ranked as high as 52nd in the world in April 2000 as a doubles player. He won a doubles title in 1999 Singapore Open with Belarusian partner and future World no. 1 doubles player Max Mirnyi beating The Woodies in the final.

In 2006, Taino won the bronze medal in the men's doubles tournament at the Asian Games held in Doha, Qatar together with his fellow Filipino-American partner Cecil Mamiit, losing to Indian pair and top doubles players Mahesh Bhupathi and Leander Paes.

He played for the Philippines Davis Cup team until 2008. Since his retirement, Taino returned to UCLA to finish his degree and remains active in tennis, coaching and playing in Los Angeles, where he resides with his family.

Junior Grand Slam finals

Doubles: 1 (1 title)

ATP Career Finals

Doubles: 7 (1 title, 6 runner-ups)

ATP Challenger and ITF Futures finals

Singles: 7 (3–4)

Doubles: 21 (10–11)

Performance timelines

Singles

Doubles

External links
 
 
 

1975 births
Living people
American male tennis players
American sportspeople of Filipino descent
Filipino male tennis players
Filipino people of American descent
Sportspeople from Jersey City, New Jersey
Tennis people from California
Tennis people from New Jersey
UCLA Bruins men's tennis players
Asian Games medalists in tennis
US Open (tennis) junior champions
Tennis players at the 2006 Asian Games
Asian Games bronze medalists for the Philippines
Medalists at the 2006 Asian Games
Southeast Asian Games gold medalists for the Philippines
Southeast Asian Games silver medalists for the Philippines
Southeast Asian Games bronze medalists for the Philippines
Southeast Asian Games medalists in tennis
Competitors at the 2005 Southeast Asian Games
Competitors at the 2007 Southeast Asian Games
Grand Slam (tennis) champions in boys' doubles